Hassan El Fad (born 24 November 1962) is a Moroccan actor and comedian born in Casablanca. He is known for his humor and comedy shows. He plays the saxophone.

His first one-man show was called Ninja. After the success of Ninja, El Fad specialized in doing serial comic shows such as Chaîne Ci BiBi, Canal 36, and Chanily TV. On-stage in 2005 El Fad presented a new one-man show Docteur Escargot ("Doctor Snail").  He also starred in the television series L'Couple.

Career 
In 2009, he presented Hassan O Rbato, a show featuring many traditional artists, recorded directly from Jemaa el-Fna square in Marrakech. In 2010, El Fad collaborated with director Abdelhak Chabi to create the series Fad TV, a spoof of sketches in 30 episodes. Hassan is working for the first time with young actors such as Badia Senhaji, Fouad Sad-Allah, Hamid Morchid, Oussama Mahmoud Ghadfi and the Moroccan singer Said Moskir. In 2011, Hassan El Fad collaborated with operator Wana Corporate and created Bayn Show, a series in the form of Quiz TV, which was broadcast on YouTube and then on the 2M channel.

Television films 

 1995 : "Alwaad"
 2003 : Rahma

TV series 

 1999 : Oujhi F'oujhek 
 2001 : Chaîne Ci BiBi 
 2003 : Canal 36
 2005 : Chanily TV 
 2007 : Tit Swit 
 2010 : Fad TV 
 2011-2012 : Bayn show 
 2012 : Diwana avec Abdelkader Secteur
 2013 : L'Couple
 2014 : L'Couple 2
 2016 : Kabour et Lahbib
 2016 : Salwa o Zoubir 
 2018 : Kabour et Lahbib 2
 2020 : Tendance
 2022 : Ti Ra Ti

Theatre

One-man-show 

 1997 : Ninja
 2005 : Docteur escargot
 2009 : Hassan O Rbaâto
 2012 : Ain Sebaâ
 2017 : Who is Kabour?

Cinéma 

 1993 : Yarit
 1993 : Lumières short film
 1996 : Fabula short film
 1997 : Les 401 coups
 1998 : Le destin d'une femme
 2000 : Ali, Rabiaa et les autres...
 2002 : Mona Saber
 2003 : Me, my mother and Bétina
 2020 : Claude Gagnon’s Les Vieux Chums: Abdel

References

External links

1962 births
Living people
21st-century Moroccan male actors
Moroccan male film actors
Moroccan male television actors
People from Casablanca
Moroccan comedians